Vanes-Mari du Toit (born 2 August 1989) is a former South African netball player. She played in the positions of GS, GK and GA. She was a member of the South Africa national netball team and has 38 caps. She has competed in the 2011 World Netball Championships in Singapore. She has also participated in the 2011 World Netball Series in Liverpool. In October 2012, she travelled with the Proteas to Australia and New Zealand to participate in the Quad Series tournament, where she made a name for herself with an impressive performance against the Silver Ferns. She endeared herself to many fans around the world with playful personality, after being seen waving to the camera while collecting an out-of-court ball.

In November 2012 she was a member of the Proteas Fast5 team in the 2012 Fast5 Netball World Series where she won a bronze medal. She is the current Vice-Captain of the South African Fast5 Team and the most capped South African Fast5 Netball player with 36 Caps.

She was linked to the Southern Steel for the 2013 season, but ultimately was not signed. Had she been, she would have been the first player from her team to play in the ANZ Championship. She then joined the Adelaide Thunderbirds during pre season training in Australia with the prospect of being their signed import player, but ultimately their current import player Carla Borrego did not receive her citizenship in time, and Vanes-Mari returned to South Africa to finish her degree in B.Com Human Resource Management at the University of Pretoria.

Vanes-Mari played for Yorkshire Jets during the 2016 Netball Superleague season. She had a great season and made her comeback after having ankle reconstruction at the end of 2015. She has been included again in the South African National Netball Team during the Netball Diamond Challenge held in South Africa 2016.

In early 2018, Vanes-Mari was a contestant on Dancing with the Stars SA. Her dancing partner was Johannes Radebe and they made it to the semi-finals.

In the 2018 Brutal Fruit Netball Cup season, she played for the North West Flames team.

References

External links
 Netball South Africa official player profile. Retrieved on 2011-11-29.
 Vanes-Mari Du Toit player profile, Netball England website. Retrieved on 2011-11-29.

South African netball players
1989 births
Living people
Afrikaner people
Sportspeople from Pretoria
University of Pretoria alumni
Netball Superleague players
Yorkshire Jets players
South African expatriate netball people in England
2011 World Netball Championships players